Schoutedenius is a genus of beetles in the family Cerambycidae, containing the following species:

 Schoutedenius albogriseus Breuning, 1954
 Schoutedenius gardneri Breuning, 1960

References

Apomecynini